Md. Abdur Rob is a Bangladesh Awami League politician and the former Member of Parliament of Chandpur-5.

Career
Abdur Rob mia was elected to parliament from Chandpur-5 as a Bangladesh Awami League candidate in 1986. He contested the 1991 election as a Bangladesh Awami League candidate.

References

Jatiya Party politicians
Living people
3rd Jatiya Sangsad members
Year of birth missing (living people)